Megarcys is a genus of springflies in the family Perlodidae. There are about 11 described species in Megarcys.

Species
These 11 species belong to the genus Megarcys:
 Megarcys bussoni (Navás, 1923)
 Megarcys irregularis (Banks, 1900)
 Megarcys magnilobus Zhiltzova, 1988
 Megarcys ochracea (Klapálek, 1912)
 Megarcys pseudochracea Zhiltzova, 1977
 Megarcys signata (Hagen, 1874)
 Megarcys sjostedti (Navás, 1930)
 Megarcys subtruncata Hanson, 1942 (truncate springfly)
 Megarcys teslenkonis Zwick & P., 2010
 Megarcys watertoni (Ricker, 1952)
 Megarcys yosemite (Needham & Claassen, 1925)

References

Further reading

 
 

Perlodidae
Articles created by Qbugbot